Currahee, a corruption of gurahiyi, a Cherokee word possibly meaning "stand alone," may refer to:

 "Currahee", the motto of the 506th Infantry Regiment, a unit of the 101st Airborne Division
 Currahee Mountain, a mountain located in Stephens County, Toccoa, Georgia which gave the motto to the 506th Parachute Infantry Regiment
 "Currahee" (Band of Brothers), the first episode of Band of Brothers written about the 506th Parachute Infantry Regiment
 Currahee!: A Screaming Eagle at Normandy, a non-fiction book by Donald Burgett, about the actions of the 506th Parachute Infantry Regiment in the Normandy Invasion
 Firebase Currahee, a former U.S. Army firebase